Cynorhiza is a genus of flowering plants belonging to the family Apiaceae.

Its native range is Southern Africa.

Species:

Cynorhiza bolusii 
Cynorhiza meifolia 
Cynorhiza typica

References

Apioideae
Apioideae genera